The following is a list of awards and nominations received by American actor, rapper, and film producer Will Smith throughout his career.

As a rapper Smith won four Grammy Awards for Best Rap Performance for "Parents Just Don't Understand" (1989), Best Rap Performance by a Duo or Group for "Summertime" (1992), and Best Rap Solo Performance for both "Men In Black" (1998), and "Gettin' Jiggy wit It" (1999).

He received the Academy Award, BAFTA Award, Golden Globe Award, Screen Actors Guild Award for his role as Richard Williams in King Richard (2021). He received single nominations for both the Emmy Award and Tony Award for producing Cobra Kai (2021) and Fela! (2009) respectively.

Major associations

Academy Awards

BAFTA Awards

Emmy Awards

Grammy Awards

Golden Globe Awards

Screen Actors Guild Awards

Tony Awards

Music

American Music Awards

!Pop rock
|-
|rowspan=4|1999
|rowspan=2|Will Smith
|Favorite Pop/Rock Male Artist
|
|rowspan=7|
|-
|Favorite Soul/R&B Male Artist
|rowspan=6 
|-
|rowspan=2|"Big Willie Style"
|Favorite Pop/Rock Album
|-
|Favorite Soul/R&B Album
|-
|rowspan=2|2000
|"Wild Wild West"
|Favorite Soundtrack
|-
|rowspan=2|Will Smith''
|rowspan=2|Favorite Pop/Rock Male Artist
|-
|2005
|-
|}

MTV Video Music Awards

|-
| rowspan=2|
| rowspan=2|"Parents Just Don't Understand" (with DJ Jazzy Jeff)
| Best Rap Video
| 
|-
| Best Direction in a Video
| rowspan=4 
|-
| rowspan=2|
| rowspan=2|"Summertime"
|Best Rap Video

|-
|Best Direction in a Video
|-
| rowspan=4|
| rowspan=4|"Men in Black"
| Best Male Video
|-
| Best Video from a Film
|rowspan=1 
|-
| Best Choreography in a Video
| rowspan=2 
|-
| Best Special Effects in a Video
|-
| rowspan=6|
| "Just the Two of Us"
| Best Male Video
| 
|-
| rowspan=5|"Gettin' Jiggy wit It"
| Video of the Year
| 
|-
| Best Rap Video
| 
|-
| Best Dance Video
| rowspan=6 
|-
| Best Choreography in a Video
|-
| Viewer's Choice
|-
| rowspan=6|
| rowspan=3|"Wild Wild West"
| Video of the Year
|-
| Best Video from a Film
|-
| Best Choreography in a Video
|-
| rowspan=3|"Miami"
| Best Male Video
| 
|-
| Best Special Effects in a Video
| rowspan=4 
|-
| Best Cinematography in a Video
|-
| rowspan=2|
| rowspan=2|"Black Suits Comin' (Nod Ya Head)"
| Best Video from a Film
|-
| Best Special Effects in a Video
|}

NRJ Music Awards

|-
| 1999
| Himself
| International Male Artist of the Year
|

Soul Train Music Awards

World Music Awards

Film & Television

César Awards

Critics' Choice Awards

References

Lists of awards received by American actor
Lists of awards received by American musician